Frederick John Simpson (June 18, 1916 – December 23, 1974) was a British boxer who competed in the 1936 Summer Olympics. He fought as Freddie Simpson. In 1936 he was eliminated in the first round of the lightweight class after losing his fight to Andy Scrivani.

He won the 1936 Amateur Boxing Association British lightweight title, when boxing out of the Battersea ABC.

External links
 profile

References

1916 births
1974 deaths
Lightweight boxers
Olympic boxers of Great Britain
Boxers at the 1936 Summer Olympics
British male boxers